Hengyuan Community is a residential community in Malan Subdistrict, Shahekou District, Dalian, Liaoning, China. In 2019, the community was moved from Xinggong Subdistrict to Malan Subdistrict.

References

External links
恒苑社区党建网 

Dalian
Communities of China